George Edward Leaupepe (born 27 April 1975 in Apia) is a Samoan rugby union player. He plays as a centre.

Career

Club career
Leaupepe has played for New Zealand amateur clubs Marist Brothers Old Boys, Papakura, Manurewa and Green Island. At the provincial championship level, he played for Auckland, Counties Manukau (reached the finals in 1996 and 1997) and Otago. In 1999 he played his 50th match for Counties Manukau.

In 1996, following the formation of the Super12 in 1996, Leaupepe joined the Highlanders and scored a try on debut against the Blues. Not selected for Super12 in 1997, Leaupepe was drafted to the Hurricanes in 1998, where he played centre in place of an injured Alama Ieremia in six of eleven games. He also played for the Chiefs in 2000 and for the Highlanders in 2001. In 2002 he left to Japan  continue his playing career for Coca-Cola Red Sparks.

Leaupepe’s home province was Counties Manukau, for whom he helped to consecutive NPC first division finals in 1996 and 1997. He continued with Counties, for another three years, bringing up his 50th game for the union in 1999.

International career
George Leaupepe scored a hat trick of tries in his first game of international rugby in his first year out of school for Western Samoa against the Victorian state side. He played 36 games for Western Samoa, including 13 tests, with six test tries. His first official test match was 13 April 1995 against South Africa in Johannesburg. In total, he played 26 test matches during his career and scored 50 points thanks to 10 tries. His last test cap was on 11 June 2005 in Sydney against Australians. Taking part at the 1995 and 1999 World Cups, he played five matches at the tournaments and scored one try.

Other representative teams include North Island U16 in 1991, New Zealand U17 in 1992, and New Zealand Secondary Schools in 1993.

He ended his playing career after several injuries that led to pinched nerves in the neck and chronic pain in the left arm; as well due to the professionalization of rugby, which resulted in serious financial losses - Leaupepe, as part of a number of players, publicly accused the New Zealand Rugby Union of insufficient support for those rugby players who received professional status.

Personal life
After his playing career, Leaupepe worked as a truck driver. He is married and has a daughter. In 2016 he was fined NZ $ 1,550 for possession of cannabis.

References

External links

George E. Leaupepe at New Zealand Rugby History

1975 births
Living people
Samoan rugby union players
Sportspeople from Apia
Samoa international rugby union players
Rugby union centres
Samoan expatriate rugby union players
Coca-Cola Red Sparks players
Samoan expatriate sportspeople in New Zealand
Samoan expatriate sportspeople in Japan
Expatriate rugby union players in New Zealand
Expatriate rugby union players in Japan
Chiefs (rugby union) players
Hurricanes (rugby union) players
Highlanders (rugby union) players
Auckland rugby union players
Otago rugby union players
Counties Manukau rugby union players
People convicted of cannabis offenses
Sportspeople convicted of crimes